William Jackson Bartley (January 8, 1885 – May 17, 1965) was an American professional baseball pitcher. He played in Major League Baseball for the New York Giants and Philadelphia Athletics.

References

Major League Baseball pitchers
New York Giants (NL) players
Philadelphia Athletics players
Beaumont Oil Gushers players
San Antonio Bronchos players
Shreveport Pirates (baseball) players
New Orleans Pelicans (baseball) players
Atlanta Crackers players
Jersey City Skeeters players
Chattanooga Lookouts players
Cleveland Green Sox players
Baseball players from Cincinnati
1885 births
1965 deaths